"Get It On" is the first single by alternative rock group Grinderman - a side project of the Australian post-punk group Nick Cave and The Bad Seeds - from their self-titled debut album Grinderman. Released on 8 January 2007, the song received positive reception from music critics, though failed to chart.

Critical reception
The song, alike the album itself, received very positive reviews, with SPIN noting that:
["Get It On"] takes a more raw, experimental approach to songwriting, and offers fans a listen to a first: Cave as a primary guitarist. While Cave & the Bad Seeds specialize in slick, darkly sexy rumblings somewhere between the Doors and Leonard Cohen, Grinderman's "Get It On" offers a study in contrast, with its blues bravado and loud, ragged riffs.

Track listing
UK 7" limited single (MUTE 370)
"Get It On" - 3:07

Digital single
"Get It On" - 3:07

Musicians and personnel
 Nick Cave – lead vocals, electric guitar, organ, piano, artwork
Warren Ellis – acoustic guitar, viola, violin, electric bouzouki, electric mandolin, backing vocals
Martyn Casey – bass, acoustic guitar, backing vocals
Jim Sclavunos – drums, percussion, backing vocals
Nick Launay – producer, engineer
Grinderman - additional production

References

2007 songs
Mute Records singles
Songs written by Nick Cave
Song recordings produced by Nick Launay